This is a list of The Rat Patrol episodes from MGM.

Series overview

Episodes

Season 1 (1966–67)

Season 2 (1967–68)

External links

Rat Patrol